Rt. Rev. George Michael Lenihan OSB (11 September 1858 – 10 February 1910) was fifth Catholic Bishop of Auckland (1896–1910).

Early life
Lenihan was born in 1858 in London to Irish parents who died while he was a child. Aged 14, he entered the Benedictine College at St Augustine's Abbey, Ramsgate under the Abbot Alcock whose associate was Father Edmund Luck. After four years there he went to St Edmund's College, Ware to study for the priesthood for the Westminster Archdiocese.  He then studied philosophy and theology at the English College at Valladolid, Spain.

In 1882 when he was sub-deacon, he was invited to accompany Bishop Luck to New Zealand and on 27 August 1882 he was ordained a priest, " ... being the first student of the Ramsgate College to be ordained to the secular priesthood".

Priesthood in Auckland
When he arrived in Auckland in 1882, Lenihan was appointed as curate to Monsignor Walter McDonald at St Patrick's Cathedral, Auckland where he remained for more than three years. In 1886, he was appointed pastor of Ponsonby, which he found without either church or presbytery. A new church for Ponsonby was blessed six months later, and opened within the year. Lenihan was also entrusted with the charge of the Star of the Sea Orphanage at St Mary's. In 1891 he was appointed as "irremovable rector" of Parnell.

Bishop of Auckland
In 1895 Lenihan was appointed Coadjutor bishop to Bishop Luck, on whose death (early in 1896) he succeeded as ordinary and was consecrated a bishop on 15 November 1896 at the relatively young age of 38. In 1899 Lenihan visited Rome and Ireland and secured more priests for the diocese. He opened Sacred Heart College, Auckland in 1903 and in 1905 undertook the completion of St Patrick's Cathedral, Auckland. This was accomplished in 1907, the complete building being dedicated in 1908 by Cardinal Moran, Archbishop of Sydney. Lenihan again visited Europe and North America in 1908 when he attended the celebration of the golden jubilee of Pope Pius X and the Eucharistic Congress in London.

Bishop Lenihan died on 23 February 1910 in Sydney, Australia.

References

Sources

 E.R. Simmons, A Brief History of the Catholic Church in New Zealand, Catholic Publication Centre, Auckland, 1978.
 E.R. Simmons, In Cruce Salus, A History of the Diocese of Auckland 1848 - 1980, Catholic Publication Centre, Auckland 1982.

External links
 Bishop George Michael Lenihan OSB, Catholic Hierarchy website (retrieved 12 February 2011)

1858 births
1910 deaths
New Zealand people of Irish descent
Roman Catholic bishops of Auckland
New Zealand Benedictines
Roman Catholic clergy from London
Benedictine bishops
19th-century Roman Catholic bishops in New Zealand
20th-century Roman Catholic bishops in New Zealand
People educated at St Edmund's College, Ware